The Ghost of War is a 1988 Nicaraguan drama film directed by Ramiro Lacayo-Deshon. The film was selected as the Nicaraguan entry for the Best Foreign Language Film at the 61st Academy Awards, but was not accepted as a nominee.

Cast
 Elmer Macfield as Reynaldo
 Alenka Díaz as María
 Manuel Poveda as Miguel
 Pilar Aguirre as Grandmother
 Carlos Aleman Ocampo as Don Teófilo

See also
 List of submissions to the 61st Academy Awards for Best Foreign Language Film
 List of Nicaraguan submissions for the Academy Award for Best Foreign Language Film

References

External links
 

1988 films
1988 drama films
Nicaraguan films
1980s Spanish-language films